Bruce Guthro (born August 31, 1961) is a Canadian singer-songwriter, from Cape Breton Island, Nova Scotia. Guthro has recorded as a solo artist, and was lead vocalist for the Scottish celtic rock band Runrig from 1998, until the group retired in 2018. Guthro has received several ECMAs (East Coast Music Awards), and hosted and conceptualized the Canadian TV show Songwriters Circle, on which guests included Jim Cuddy, Colin James, and Alan Doyle (of the Canadian band Great Big Sea).

Guthro is also the father of musicians Dylan Guthro and Jodi Guthro. He co-produced Dylan's award-winning 2012 debut album All That's True with Dave Gunning and co-wrote five of the album's songs.

He resides in Hammonds Plains, Nova Scotia.

Discography

Albums

Singles

Music videos

Samplers

Guest appearances

Awards

References

External links
 Bruce Guthro 

1961 births
Canadian male singer-songwriters
Canadian folk singer-songwriters
Canadian pop singers
Canadian country singer-songwriters
Living people
Musicians from Nova Scotia
Runrig members
Canadian Country Music Association Rising Star Award winners